Maxwell Anthony Moroff (born May 13, 1993) is an American professional baseball infielder who is a free agent. He has played in Major League Baseball (MLB) for the Pittsburgh Pirates, Cleveland Indians, and St. Louis Cardinals.

Career

Pittsburgh Pirates
Moroff was drafted by the Pittsburgh Pirates in the 16th round of the 2012 Major League Baseball draft out of Trinity Preparatory School in Winter Park, Florida. He signed on the last day of the trade deadline for $300,000 which equated to a 4th round slot bonus. On July 24, 2012, Moroff made his professional debut with the Gulf Coast Pirates as the shortstop and leadoff hitter. He had a single, three walks and a stolen base. He has progressed a level every season, spending 2013 with the West Virginia Power and 2014 with the Bradenton Marauders.

Moroff was assigned to the Double-A Altoona Curve to begin the 2015 season. Moroff was named player of the week by the Eastern League for the week of April 20–26, batting .474 with four doubles, one triple, one homer, four RBI and two runs scored in 5 games. Moroff was then named to the Eastern League Mid-Season All-Star team where he started as the second baseman for the Western division. Towards the end of the season, Moroff was selected as a 2015 Eastern League All-Star. He finished the season breaking an Altoona Curve franchise record with 153 hits as a switch hitter, which was last set in 2002 at 142 hits. On September 11, Moroff was named by Baseball America to one of the Minor League Classification All-Star Teams, where he was selected as the AA second baseman out of the Eastern League, Texas League, and Southern League. On September 15, Moroff was named as the Pittsburgh Pirates Minor League Player of the Year, after batting .293 with 28 doubles, six triples, seven home runs, 51 RBI, 17 stolen bases, 79 runs scored and a .322 on-base percentage. He also led the Eastern League in runs scored (79) and games played (136) while also ranking second in hits (153), third in walks (70) and fourth in total bases (214). In the field, Moroff led all Eastern League second basemen in fielding percentage (.978), double plays (76) and assists (330). The Pirates added him to their 40-man roster after the season.

Cleveland Indians
On November 14, 2018, the Pirates traded Moroff and Jordan Luplow to the Cleveland Indians in exchange for Erik González, Tahnaj Thomas, and Dante Mendoza. Moroff was designated for assignment on May 5, 2019 and was subsequently outrighted to the minor leagues after clearing waivers on May 11, 2019. Moroff elected free agency on November 4, 2019.

New York Mets
On December 5, 2019, Moroff signed a minor league contract with the New York Mets. He became a free agent on November 2, 2020.

St. Louis Cardinals
On December 15, 2020, Moroff signed a minor league contract with the St. Louis Cardinals organization and was invited to Spring Training. On May 14, 2021, Moroff was selected to the active roster. On June 6, it was announced that Moroff would require season-ending surgery on his left shoulder after previously suffering a shoulder subluxation. In six games for St. Louis, he batted 1-for-16 (.063) with one RBI. He was placed on the 60-day injured list on June 17. On November 5, 2021, Moroff was outrighted off of the 40-man roster. He elected free agency on November 7.

References

External links

1993 births
Living people
Sportspeople from Winter Park, Florida
Baseball players from Florida
Major League Baseball infielders
Pittsburgh Pirates players
Cleveland Indians players
St. Louis Cardinals players
Gulf Coast Pirates players
West Virginia Power players
Bradenton Marauders players
Altoona Curve players
Indianapolis Indians players
Memphis Redbirds players
Trinity Preparatory School alumni